Adam Beyer (born 15 May 1976 in Stockholm, Sweden) is a Swedish techno producer and DJ. He is the founder of Drumcode Records, and is one of several Swedish techno artists to emerge in the mid-1990s, along with Cari Lekebusch and Jesper Dahlbäck. Beyer was married to fellow Swedish DJ Ida Engberg (now separated), with whom he has three daughters. He also hosts a weekly radio show called Drumcode Live which has a weekly audience of 11 million, making it the most listened to weekly techno broadcast in the world.

Discography 
As an artist, Beyer has released four albums and a number of EPs, while also working as a producer and remix artist.

Studio albums 
 Decoded (1996)
 Recoded (1997)
 Protechtion (1999)
 Ignition Key (2002)
Selected Works (1996-2000) (DC01-20 Remastered) 
Fabric 22 (2005)

EPs, mixes and singles 
 Fabric 22 (2005)
 Fuse Presents Adam Beyer (2008)
 "London", (2009)
 "No Rain" (2011)
 "Flap" (2012)
 "Eye Contact" (2012)
 "Unanswered Question" (with Ida Engberg) (2013)
 "Teach Me" (2014)
 "Capsule" (with Pig&Dan) (2017)
 "Space Date" (with Layton Giordani & Green Velvet) (2018)  
 "Your Mind" (with Bart Skils) (2018)
 "Data Point" (with Green Velvet & Layton Giordani) 2019

DJ Magazine Top 100 DJs

External links 
 Drumcode Records

References 

1976 births
Living people
Swedish DJs
Swedish house musicians
Swedish techno musicians
Electronic dance music DJs
House musicians
Electronic musicians